CSU UV Timișoara, formerly known as Știința Timișoara or  Universitatea Timișoara, is a women's handball team based in Timișoara, Romania that competes in the Divizia A.

Honours

Domestic competitions 
 Liga Națională
 Winners (10): 1964, 1966, 1968, 1969, 1970, 1972, 1975, 1976, 1977, 1978 
 Second place: 1961, 1963, 1965, 1967, 1971, 1973, 1974
 Third place: 1960

European competitions
 European Champions Cup:
 Finalists: 1973
 Third place: 1967

Former players
  Cristina Petrovici
  Doina Petruța Cojocaru
  Elisabeta Ionescu 
  Edeltraut Franz-Sauer
  Gherlinde Reip-Oprea
  Nadire Ibadula-Luțaș
  Irina Günther 
  Hilda Hrivnak
  Terezia Popa   
  Lidia Stan
  Niculina Iordache

Former coaches
  Constantin Lache
  Constantin Jude 
  Victor Chița 
  Gabriel Zugrăvescu
  Ion Bota

See also
 Politehnica Timișoara

References

External links
   
 

Handball clubs established in 1949
Romanian handball clubs
1949 establishments in Romania
Sport in Timișoara